Harryson is a surname. Notable people with the surname include:

Peter Harryson (born 1948), Swedish actor, singer, and entertainer
John Harryson (1926–2008), Swedish actor, father of Peter

See also
Harrison (name)